Chasing Yesterday is a series of books written by Robin Wasserman. The series follows a girl after she wakes up in the middle of rubble, with no memory of her past. The series includes Awakening, Betrayal, and Truth.

References

Young adult novel series
American young adult novels